Mapinguari National Park is a national park in the states of Rondônia and Amazonas, Brazil.
It covers a large area of Amazon rainforest. The boundaries have been adjusted several times.

Location

The Mapinguari National Park is in the municipalities of Canutama (40%) and Lábrea (50%) in Amazonas and the municipality of Porto Velho (11%) in Rondônia.
The park is in the Solimões-Amazonas sedimentary basin, in the south Amazon depression.
The relief is an extensive pediplain with river terraces, floodplains and meander traces.
It is drained by streams or rivers feeding the left of the Madeira River and the right of the Purus River.
The main rivers within the park are the Açuã, Mucuim, Inacorrã, Umari, Ciriquiqui, Punicici, Coari, Anaiquê and Coti.

Environment

The park is in the Amazon biome.
Vegetation includes savannah and rainforest (56%), open submontane rainforest (11%) and savannah parkland (9%).
 of the savannah portion is subject to forest fires.
Some of the savanna is periodically flooded and susceptible to fires in the dry season.
The primate Stephen Nash's titi (Callicebus stephennashi) has been found in the park.
A new species of bird, the Campina jay (Cyanocorax hafferi), was recently found in the transition between the rainforest and the natural fields.

Legal history

The objectives are to preserve natural ecosystems of great ecological relevance and scenic beauty, and in particular enclaves of Savannah in the Purus-Madeira interfluvial region, to support  scientific research, environmental education, recreation in contact with nature and ecotourism.
The park is administered by the Chico Mendes Institute for Biodiversity Conservation (ICMBio).

The boundaries were modified by law 12249 of 11 June 2010 which added about  but excluded the area that would be flooded by the Jirau Dam to create the reservoir for the Jirau Hydroelectric Power Plant.
The added land had formerly been state conservation units, the Rio Vermelho State Forest (A and B), the Antônio Mugica Nava Ecological Station and part of the Serra dos Três Irmãos Ecological Station.
Law 12249 was challenged in July 2013 by the federal Attorney General on the basis of unconstitutionality.
This was followed by moves by the state legislature to annul creation of the state conservation units, which were in turn overturned.

An ordinance of 9 January 2012 provided for a consistent and integrated approach to preparing management plans for the conservation units in the BR-319 area of influence. These are the Abufari Biological Reserve, Cuniã Ecological Station, Nascentes do Lago Jari and Mapinguari national parks, Balata-Tufari, Humaitá and Iquiri national forests, and the  Lago do Capanã-Grande, Rio Ituxi, Médio Purus and Lago do Cuniã extractive reserves.
Law 12.678 of 25 June 2012 slightly reduced the park's size and allowed mining activities in the buffer zone.
The law amended the limits of the Amazônia, Campos Amazônicos and Mapinguari national parks, the Itaituba I, Itaituba II and Crepori national forests and the Tapajós Environmental Protection Area.
All of these were reduced in size except the Campos Amazônicos.
An advisory council was established on 8 March 2013.

Notes

Sources

See also
Purus várzea

2008 establishments in Brazil
National parks of Brazil
Protected areas of Rondônia
Protected areas of Amazonas (Brazilian state)